Ulrich Bremi (6 November 1929 – 17 June 2021) was a Swiss politician who served as member (1986–1989) and President of the National Council.

References

1929 births
2021 deaths
Swiss politicians
Swiss publishers (people)
Swiss military personnel
Presidents of the National Council (Switzerland)
Members of the National Council (Switzerland)
Free Democratic Party of Switzerland politicians
ETH Zurich alumni
Credit Suisse people
Politicians from Zürich